Armissan is a commune in the Aude department in the Occitanie region of southern France.

The inhabitants of the commune are known as Armissannais or Armissannaises

Geography
Armissan is part of the urban area of Narbonne and is located just 2 km east of the city immediately south of Vinassan and inside the Regional Natural Park of Narbonne. Access to the commune is by road D68 from Narbonne passing through the town and continuing south-east to join the D168 to Narbonne-Plage at the southern border of the commune. The D168 from Narbonne to Narbonne-Plage also passes through the south of the commune. There is also the D31 going south from Vinasson through the west of the commune to join the D32. The A9 autoroute passes through the west of the commune but has no exit - the nearest exit is Exit 37 at Narbonne. The commune has large forests in the south-west and in the north with the rest of the commune farmland.

The Ruisseau Mayral with many tributaries flows through the village west to join a network of canals west of the A9.

History

Heraldry

Administration

List of Successive Mayors

Demography
In 2017 the commune had 1,520 inhabitants.

Economy
The commune is part of the Languedoc AOC.

Sites and monuments

The Remains of the Church of Saint Peter (Middle Ages) are registered as an historical monument.
The Chateau of Armissan
The War Memorial (20th century) is registered as an historical object.

The Church of Saint-Etienne contains many items that are registered as historical objects:

The Tombstone of René de Chefdebien (1615)
Statues (18th-19th century)
An Altar Painting: Saints Pierre and Etienne (17th century)
A box for holy oils (1684)
A Ciborium (1654)
A Ciborium (17th century)
A Bronze Bell (1732)
A Sacristy Washbasin (15th century)
A Statue/Reliquary: Saint Roch (18th century)
4 Altar Candlesticks and a Cross (17th century)
6 Altar Candlesticks and a Cross (17th century)

See also
Communes of the Aude department

References

External links
Armissan official website 
Armissan on Géoportail, National Geographic Institute (IGN) website 
Armißan on the 1750 Cassini Map

Communes of Aude